The Judicate of Cagliari was one of the four Sardinian judicates of the Middle Ages, kingdoms of Byzantine origins.

The Judicate of Cagliari covered the entire south and central east portion of the island and was composed of thirteen subdivisions called . To its north and west lay Arborea and north and on the east lay Gallura and Logudoro.

Origins and extent
The exact date of  birth of the Judicate of Cagliari is unknown. After the Byzantine conquest of Sardinia, that took place in 534, the island became one of the provinces of the Exarchate of Africa and was governed by a magistrate of the empire said Iudex Provinciae, resident in Cagliari.

Until the beginning of the 8th century, Sardinia remained a Byzantine province, but when the Arabs conquered Sicily (827), communications between Byzantium and its westernmost province became very difficult. In such situation the island, that had to face several Saracen raids, became de facto independent.

Cagliari, the capital in turn of the Roman, Vandal and Byzantine provinces of Sardinia, was historically the most important cities on Sardinia. However starting from the 8-9th century the city was abandoned because it was too exposed to attacks by Moorish pirates. Apparently many people left Cagliari and founded a new town named Santa Igia in an area close to the Santa Gilla swamp to the west of Cagliari, but distant from the sea. Santa Igia became then the capital of the Judicate of Cagliari, one of the four Kingdoms that evolved when imperial power receded in the West.

The Judicate of Cagliari comprised a large area of the Campidano plain, the mineral-rich Sulcis region, and the mountainous Ogliastra.

The first Judges

The first giudice well known to history is Torchitorio I of the  Lacon-Gunale family. His birth name was Orzocco, Torchitorio being a dynastic name. The first ruling dynasty, the Lacon-Gunale, probably arose from the merger of two families, the Lacon and the Gunale (or Unale). Perhaps in honor of two members of these families (Salusio de Lacon and Torchitorio de Gunale) all rulers of Cagliari traditionally adopted a moniker added to their birth name, alternating between Salusio and Torchitorio. Torchitorio I was judge at a time when Western monasticism was being introduced into Sardinia as part of the Gregorian reform of the Papacy. Cagliari, like the other giudicati, was placed under papal and Pisan authority. Torchitorio was a sponsor of the monks of Monte Cassino who were arriving on the island to bring economic, technological, and religious renewal. Torchitorio succeeded in having his son succeed him around 1089, when Constantine I appeared with the title of rex et iudex Caralitanus: "King and Judge of Cagliari."

Among the traditions of these early giudici was that of confirming one of one's predecessor's acts, usually donations of land or grants of privileges. Constantine II patronised the monasteries founded by monks from Saint-Victor in Marseille. However, surging Pisan religious houses came into conflict the Provençal monasteries, while the archbishop of Cagliari came into conflict with not only the archbishop of Pisa, but also Constantine. Nevertheless, the 1150s saw restoration and renovation of sacred art and edifices. Along with Gonario II of Torres and Comita I of Gallura, Constantine pledged fidelity to the archbishop of Pisa. All this suggests strong allegiance to the reformed papacy despite the still near-autonomous status of Cagliari at the time.

House of Massa and Pisan domination

Constantine II's daughter succeeded him with her husband Peter. The Pisans tried to remove him after her death and they sent Obert, Margrave of Massa, to conquer the giudicato. The son of Obert and one of the daughter of Constantine II of Cagliari, William I became then the new judge of Cagliari.

William spent his reign (1188 – 1214) in constant wars with Arborea, Gallura, and Logudoro. He arrested and imprisoned the judge of Arborea, Peter I and ruled Arborea in his name. He tried to conquer Gallura, but was rebuffed by Lamberto Visconti. He was on fairly good terms with the Pisans throughout his career, but on his death, he left only daughters. Benedetta, his heiress, was married to Barisone III of Arborea and thus those two giudicati were united, to be torn apart on his death (1217). Cagliari slowly declined thereafter, as various factions fought for the control of Benedetta. Pisan interference became stronger than ever. In 1256, John tried to throw off the Pisan yoke and allied with the Republic of Genoa, but was assassinated by Pisan agents. John was succeeded by his cousin William III of Cagliari; soon Pisa and the other Giudicati attacked Cagliari besieging Santa Igia. Cagliari lost the war and in 1258 the history of the giudicato came to a sudden close; his territory was partitioned in three parts that were assigned to the Della Gherardesca family, Arborea and Gallura while Pisa maintained the control over Castel di Castro.

See also
List of judges (judikes) of Cagliari

References

Sources
Dizionario Biografico degli Italiani. Rome, 1963 – Present.
Nowé, Laura Sannia. Dai "lumi" dalla patria Italiana: Cultura letteraria sarda. Mucchi Editore: Modena, 1996. 
Casula, Francesco. "The History of Sardinia." Sardinia Tourist Board. 1989.
Solmi A., Studi storici sulle istituzioni della Sardegna nel Medioevo, Cagliari 1917.

Cagliari
Cagliari
History of Sardinia
Medieval Italy
2nd millennium in Italy
Former monarchies of Europe